The University of Nova Gorica, UNG, is the fourth university in Slovenia. It is located in the towns of Nova Gorica, Gorizia (in Italy), Vipava, and Ajdovščina.

History
The University of Nova Gorica grew out of the School of Environmental Sciences founded in 1995 by the City Municipality of Nova Gorica and the Jožef Stefan Institute. Later two more institutions joined as the founders: the Research Center of the Slovenian Academy of Sciences and Arts and the Municipality of Ajdovščina. In March 2006, the former Nova Gorica Polytechnic was renamed the University of Nova Gorica. Today the university has 7 schools and 10 research institutes.

Organization
Faculties and schools:

 Graduate school
 School for Viticulture and Enology
 School of Science
 School of Engineering and Management
 School of Environmental Sciences
 School of Humanities
 School of Arts

Research institutes:
 Center for Astrophysics and Cosmology
 Center for Atmospheric Research
 Center for Cognitive Science of Language
 Centre for Information Technologies and Applied Mathematics
 Research Centre for Humanities
 Wine Research Centre
 Laboratory for Environmental and Life Sciences
 Laboratory of Organic Matter Physics
 Laboratory of Quantum Optics
 Materials Research Laboratory

References

External links 
  

 
1995 establishments in Slovenia
Universities in Slovenia
Educational institutions established in 1995
University of Nova Gorica
Schools in the Slovene Littoral